Mohabbat Aag Si is a 2015 Pakistani romantic drama serial. The series is directed by Ahmed Kamran and produced by Moomal Entertainment. It stars Iffat Omar, Sarah Khan, Azfar Rehman, Tipu Shareef, Uzma Hassan and Faiza Gillani in leading roles. The program airs Wednesday and Thursday evenings. At 15th Lux Style Awards it received four nominations.

Summary 
Story revolves around Aapa Jee (Iffat Omar) and the mystery behind her real identity. In the daytime she acts very religious and people believe she can cure illnesses, however at night time she has a different identity - she listens to music and dresses up in clothes like a dancer. Aapa Jee is very insecure when it comes to her younger brothers. Her younger brother, Sharafat (Tipu Shareef) is praying to have a child but Aapa Jee's wish is for him not to have a child as he will be lured away by his wife's love so she makes Samia (Uzma) drink a 'Dham wala Dhood' daily. The youngest from the three is Wajahat (Azfar Rehman) who falls in love with Samia's cousin, Saba (Sarah Khan). Aapa Jee does her best to keep the two away so they do not have a child.
 
Gradually, Saba begins to discover that Aapa Jee isn't who she really is as she hears music from Aapa Jee's room and notes other things. Will Saba be able unveil the true face of Aapa Jee? Watch Mohabbat Aag Si to find out...

Cast 
 Iffat Rahim as Rukhsana
 Alyy Khan as Arshad Jr.
 Sarah Khan as Saba
 Azfar Rehman as Wajahat
 Tipu Sharif as Sharafat
 Uzma Hassan as Samiya
 Faiza Gillani as Shareefa
 Seema Seher
 Zainab Ahmed as Farida
 Sajida Syed
 Syed Mazhar Ali
 Imran Ashraf as Arshad Jr.
 Awais Waseer

Guest 
 Humaira Ali as Samiya's mother (Dead)
 Mubashira Khanum as Saba's mother
 Gul-e-Rana
 Fouzia Mushtaq

Soundtrack
The title song is written by Wasi Shah, with composition by Raheel Fayyaz.

Track listing

Awards

References

External links
 

Hum TV original programming
Urdu-language television shows
Pakistani drama television series
2015 Pakistani television series debuts
2015 Pakistani television series endings